David Wylie Bleakley CBE (11 January 1925  26 June 2017) was a politician and peace campaigner in Northern Ireland.

Born in the Strandtown district of Belfast, Bleakley worked as an electrician in the Harland and Wolff dockyards while becoming increasingly active in his trade union. He studied economics at Ruskin College in Oxford, where he struck up a friendship with C. S. Lewis about whom he later wrote a centenary memoir. He later attended Queen's University, Belfast. A committed Christian, he was a lifelong Anglican – a member of the Church of Ireland. Throughout his life, he was a lay preacher.

Bleakley joined the Northern Ireland Labour Party (NILP) and contested the Northern Ireland Parliament seat of Belfast Victoria in 1949 and 1953 before finally winning it in 1958.  At Stormont, he was made the Chairman of the Public Accounts Committee, but he lost his seat in 1965.  Bleakley was head of the department of economics and political studies at Methodist College Belfast from 1969 to 1979.

Bleakley ran for the Westminster seat of Belfast East in 1970 (gaining 41% of the vote), February 1974 and October 1974 for the Northern Ireland Labour Party each time, but never enough to win the Westminster seat from the UUP. In 1971, Brian Faulkner appointed him as his Minister for Community Relations at Stormont, but as Bleakley was not an MP, he could only hold this post for six months.  He resigned five days before his term expired in order to highlight his disagreement with government policy, specifically the failure to widen the government to include non-Unionist parties, and the decision to introduce internment. Bleakley wrote a respectful biography of Faulkner and his own memoir of the period.

After the Parliament was abolished, Bleakley stood for, and was elected to, the Northern Ireland Assembly and its successor, the Northern Ireland Constitutional Convention.  He stood again for Belfast East in the February and October UK general elections, but won only 14% of the vote each time.

Bleakley was appointed to a position as a visiting professor in the University of Bradford's Department of Peace Studies by Professor Adam Curle soon after the Department's founding in 1973.

By the late 1970s, the NILP was in disarray, and did not stand a candidate for the 1979 European Assembly election.  Bleakley instead stood as an "Independent Community Candidate", but took only 1.6% of the votes cast.

During the 1980s, Bleakley sat as a non-partisan member of various quangos.  From 1980 to 1992 he was general secretary of the Irish Council of Churches. In 1992, he joined the Alliance Party of Northern Ireland and was an advisor to the group during the all-party talks.  For the 1996 Northern Ireland Forum election, he was a prominent member of the Democratic Partnership list and stood in Belfast East, but was not elected.  In 1998, he joined the Labour Party of Northern Ireland and stood in Belfast East in the Assembly elections, receiving 369 first preference votes.   He died on 26 June 2017 at the age of 92.

Honours
In 1984 received an CBE for his work as chairman of the Northern Ireland Standing Advisory Commission on Human Rights.

Publications
Faulkner – Conflict and Consent in Irish Politics, A R Mowbray, London 1974.
Peace in Ulster, A R Mowbray, London, 1972.
C. S. Lewis, at Home in Ireland, Strandtown Press, Bangor, Northern Ireland, 1998. .

References

1925 births
2017 deaths
20th-century Anglicans
21st-century Anglicans
Academics of the University of Bradford
Alumni of Queen's University Belfast
Alumni of Ruskin College
Anglicans from Northern Ireland
Commanders of the Order of the British Empire
Members of the Fabian Society
Members of the House of Commons of Northern Ireland 1958–1962
Members of the House of Commons of Northern Ireland 1962–1965
Members of the House of Commons of Northern Ireland for Belfast constituencies
Members of the Northern Ireland Assembly 1973–1974
Members of the Northern Ireland Constitutional Convention
Members of the Privy Council of Northern Ireland
Northern Ireland Labour Party members of the House of Commons of Northern Ireland
Politicians from Belfast
Alliance Party of Northern Ireland politicians
British human rights activists